The 1949 South American Championship was the 21st edition of the Copa América, the main national team football competition in South America. It was held in, and won by, Brazil. Paraguay finished as runner-up while Argentina withdrew from the tournament.

This achievement ended a 27-year streak without official titles for the Brazilians. The last one had been in the 1922 South American Championship, also played on Brazilian soil. Jair Rosa Pinto from Brazil was the top scorer of the tournament, with nine goals.

Squads
For a complete list of participating squads, see: 1949 South American Championship squads

Venues

Final round

Play-off

A playoff match was played between Brazil and Paraguay to determine the champion.

Result

Goalscorers

9 goals
  Jair

7 goals

  Ademir
  Tesourinha
  Arce
  Benítez

5 goals

  Víctor Ugarte
  Simão
  Zizinho

4 goals

  Félix Castillo
  Ramón Castro

3 goals

  Benigno Gutiérrez
  Cláudio
  Nininho
  López Fretes
  Alfredo Mosquera
  Víctor Pedraza
  Roberto Drago
  Juan Ayala

2 goals

  Benedicto Godoy
  Orlando
  Raimundo Infante
  Pedro López
  José Vargas
  Marcial Barrios
  Carlos Gómez Sánchez
  Juan E. Salinas
  José M. García
  Dagoberto Moll

1 goal

  Víctor Algañaraz
  Nemesio Rojas
  Augusto
  Canhotinho
  Danilo Alvim
  Octavio
  Mario Castro
  Atilio Cremaschi
  Ulises Ramos
  Fernando Riera
  Carlos Rojas
  Manuel Salamanca
  A. Pérez
  Berdugo
  Gastelbondo
  Nelson Pérez
  Víctor Arteaga
  Sigifredo Chuchuca
  Enrique Cantos
  Guido Andrade
  Rafael Maldonado
  Enrique Avalos
  Pedro Fernández
  Cornelio Heredia
  Manuel Drago
  Ernesto Bentancour
  Miguel Martínez
  Nelson Moreno

Own goals
  Bermeo (for Peru)
  Sánchez (for Bolivia)
  Arce (for Brazil)

External links
 South American Championship 1949 at RSSSF

References

 
Copa América tournaments
1949 in South American football
South
April 1949 sports events in South America
May 1949 sports events in South America
Sport in Belo Horizonte
Santos, São Paulo
International sports competitions in Rio de Janeiro (city)
International sports competitions in São Paulo
20th century in Rio de Janeiro
20th century in São Paulo
International association football competitions hosted by Brazil
Bask